Party of Hope may refer to one of the following parties.

 Party of Hope (Azerbaijan)
 Party of Hope (El Salvador)
 Party of Hope (Japan)
 Party of Hope (Morocco)